Fran McNulty (born 10 December 1979, Ireland) is a television presenter with the Irish National Broadcaster RTÉ. Fran is a native of County Longford. 

Since 2005 McNulty has been a regular presenter on television and on radio programmes Morning Ireland, This Week and News at One.

He is an multi award-winning reporter, who spent several years working in local radio and print before joining RTÉ.

He has worked across Television, online and Radio with RTÉ and often reports from overseas on major international stories. As well as covering Papal funerals and conclaves in Rome, in 2013 he covered the funeral of Nelson Mandela presenting a special edition of Morning Ireland from Johannesburg. The Irish journalist interviewed members of the Mandela family and former South African President Thabo Mbeki during his visits to South Africa. He blogged and reported from all over South Africa during his time there.

In 2019 McNulty was appointed Agriculture & Consumer Affairs Correspondent for the National Broadcaster. In 2020 he won an award for Best Audio Report from the Irish Guild of Agricultural Journalists for a report he broadcast on Morning Ireland

On 22 March 2021, it was announced that McNulty had been appointed to present Prime Time alongside Miriam O'Callaghan and Sarah McInerney from 6 April.

As an anchor of the Current Affairs programme he continues to report. In 2021 his investigation into crack cocaine use in Dublin exposed illicit drug sales which experts said were of "epidemic" proportions One corner in Ballymun, four hours, 42 drug deals: A crack epidemic

References 

RTÉ Radio presenters
Living people
Irish journalists
Irish women journalists
Irish women radio presenters
1981 births